Karby may refer to:

Karby, Denmark, a village near Rakkeby on the island of Mors
Karby, Schleswig-Holstein, Germany
Karby, Sweden

See also

 Carby (disambiguation)
 Rolf Kaarby (1909–1976), Norwegian skier
 Karey (disambiguation)
Karly